The Women's 470 is a sailing event on the Sailing at the 2020 Summer Olympics program in Tokyo, in the 470 dinghy that takes place between 28 July - 2 August 2021 at Enoshima Yacht Harbor. 11 races (the last one a medal race) will be held. 21 teams have qualified for the event.

Medals were presented by Camilo Pérez López Moreira, IOC Member, Paraguay; and the medalists' bouquets presented by Mr. Tomasz Chamera, World Sailing Vice-President, Poland.

Schedule

Results

References 

Men's 470
470 competitions
Women's events at the 2020 Summer Olympics